Chuck Girard (born on August 27, 1943) is a pioneer of Contemporary Christian music. He moved to Santa Rosa, California in his young teens and was a member of the Castells and later the surf-rock band The Hondells. In 1970 he was a founding member of Love Song, the first Christian rock band to become popular in the United States.

In 1975, Girard became a solo artist after leaving Love Song. He wrote and performed the songs "Sometimes Alleluia" and "Rock 'N' Roll Preacher"; both were featured on his debut album Chuck Girard. It also featured the band Ambrosia prominently throughout. Girard in turn was featured on Ambrosia's albums Ambrosia and Somewhere I've Never Travelled, though the albums' credits do not indicate which tracks he contributed to or in what capacity.

He is the father of Alisa Childers, a member of the former Christian girl group ZOEgirl and Christian apologist.

Discography

Secular albums 

 The Castells So This Is Love (Era Records, 1961)
 The Best of the Castells (K-Tel, 2000)
 The Hondells Go Little Honda (Mercury Records, 1964)
 The Hondells (Mercury Records, 1964)
 The Hondells Greatest Hits (Curb Records, 1996)
 The Ghouls Dracula's Deuce'
 Mr. Gasser & The Weird-Ohs Silly Surfers The Revells The Go Sound of the Slots Singles 

The Castells
 "Make Believe Wedding" (1961) US No. 98
 "Sacred" (1961) US No. 20
 "So This Is Love"  (1961) US No. 21

The Hondells
 "Little Honda" (1964) US: #9
 "My Buddy Seat" (1965) US: #87
 "Younger Girl" (1966) US: #52

 With Love Song 

 Love Song (Good News Records, 1972)
 Final Touch (Good News Records, 1974)
 "Feel the Love" (live double LP) (Good News Records, 1977)
 "Welcome Back" (CD) (Maranatha/Word, 1995)

 Solo albums 

 Chuck Girard (Good News Records, 1975)
 Glow in the Dark (Good News Records, 1976)
 Written on the Wind (Good News Records, 1977)
 Take it Easy (Good News Records, 1978)
 The Stand (Good News Records, 1980)
 The Name Above All Names (Seven Thunders Records, 1983)
 Fire & Light (Seven Thunders Records, 1991)
 Voice of the Wind (Seven Thunders Records, 1994)
 Heart of Christmas (Seven Thunders Records, 2001)
 Evening Shadows (Seven Thunders Records, 2008)

 Compilations 

 First Love'' (Exploration Films, 1998)a concert film and documentary

References

External links 

 
 First Love DVD
 TheBeginningsConcert.com

Living people
American male singers
American performers of Christian music
Love Song (band) members
Six the Hardway members
1943 births
Singers from Los Angeles